John Richardson (19 January 1934 – 5 January 2021) was an English actor who appeared in films from the late 1950s until the early 1990s. He was a male lead in Italian genre films, most notably Mario Bava's Black Sunday (1960) with Barbara Steele, but he was best known for playing the love interest of Ursula Andress in She (1965) and then of Raquel Welch in One Million Years B.C. (1966).

Career
Richardson was born on 19 January 1934 in Worthing, West Sussex. He served in the Merchant Navy. He initially had no desire to be an actor but when he left the service, his looks saw him receive an offer to appear in a play by a local amateur theatre group in his home town. He enjoyed it and began to work for several repertory companies around Britain.

He was spotted by a talent scout from 20th Century Fox who put him under contract. This lasted for two years but he did little.

He had some small roles in film for the Rank Organisation, including A Night to Remember (1958), Sapphire (1959), and The 39 Steps (1959).

His first role of note was in the Italian gothic horror film, Black Sunday (1960), directed by Mario Bava, which starred fellow British actress Barbara Steele. Richardson stayed in Italy for a supporting role in the swashbuckler, Pirates of Tortuga (1961). Back in Britain, he had minor roles in Tender Is the Night (1962) and Lord Jim (1965).

Leading man
Richardson's big breakthrough came when Ray Stark spotted him in the offices of Seven Arts Productions and cast him as the male lead in She (1965), which they were co-producing with Hammer Films. The film was a solid hit. Richardson was the only actor to reprise his role in the sequel, The Vengeance of She (1968), but that film was a flop.

Hammer and Seven Arts used Richardson again supporting another female star, this time Raquel Welch in One Million Years B.C. (1966). It was another big hit.

Returning to Italy, Richardson had the lead in the spaghetti Westerns, John the Bastard (1967) and Execution (1968), and a supporting role in On My Way to the Crusades, I Met a Girl Who... (1967).

In the late 1960s, he was considered for the role of James Bond in On Her Majesty's Secret Service (1969) when Sean Connery first left the franchise, but he lost out to George Lazenby.

Richardson and his wife, English actress Martine Beswick, moved to Hollywood in 1968. Richardson had a supporting role in On a Clear Day You Can See Forever (1970) as a ne'er-do-well who is seduced by Barbra Streisand's character Melinda but eventually abandons her.

Richardson and Beswick divorced in 1973. That year, Richardson based himself out of Italy once more and appeared in some giallo films: Torso (1973), Eyeball (1975), Reflections in Black (1975), Nine Guests for a Crime (1977),  and Murder Obsession (1981). His other films of the period include; Duck in Orange Sauce (1975) a comedy and Cosmos: War of the Planets (1977) a science fiction movie.

Death
Richardson died from COVID-19 on 5 January 2021, at age 86, during the COVID-19 pandemic in England.

Selected filmography

A Night to Remember (1958) - Valet (uncredited)
Bachelor of Hearts (1958) - Robin
Operation Amsterdam (1959) - Lt. Williams (uncredited)
The 39 Steps (1959) - House Guest (uncredited)
Sapphire (1959) - Student (uncredited)
The Heart of a Man (1959) - Official (uncredited)
Black Sunday (1960) - Dr. Andre Gorobec
Pirates of Tortuga (1961) - Percy
Tender is the Night (1962) - Young Man Being Photographed (uncredited)
Lord Jim (1965) - The sailor (uncredited)
She (1965) - Leo
One Million Years B.C. (1966) - Tumak
The Tough One (1966)
On My Way to the Crusades, I Met a Girl Who... (1967) - Dragone
John the Bastard (1967) - John Donald Tenorio
A Nun at the Crossroads (1967) - Dr. Pierre Lemmon
The Vengeance of She (1968) - Killikrates
Execution (1968) - Bill Coler / John Coler
A Candidate for a Killing (1969) - Nick Warfield / André Jarvis / Riquelli
On a Clear Day You Can See Forever (1970) - Robert Tentrees
Frankenstein '80 (1972) - Karl Schein
Torso (1973) - Franz
Anna, quel particolare piacere (1973) - Lorenzo Viotto
The Tree with Pink Leaves (1974) - Andrea (Marco's father)
La bellissima estate (1974) - Vittorio
Eyeball (1975) - Mark Burton
Reflections in Black (1975) - Inspector Lavina
Duck in Orange Sauce (1975) - John Hardy
Four Billion in Four Minutes (1976) - Francesco Vitale
Nine Guests for a Crime (1977) - Lorenzo
War of the Planets (1977) - Captain Fred Hamilton
Canne mozze (1977) - Michele
Battle of the Stars (1978) - Captain Mike Layton
Happy Birthday, Harry (1980) - Harry Petersen
Paradiso Blu (1980) - Kris
Murder Syndrome (1981) - Oliver
Scuola di ladri - Parte seconda (1987) - Il ricco gondoliere
The Church (1989) - Architect
Milner (1994, TV Movie) - Edward (final film role)

References

External links

1934 births
2021 deaths
20th-century English male actors
21st-century English male actors
Actors from Sussex
Deaths from the COVID-19 pandemic in England
English male film actors
English male television actors
People from Worthing
20th Century Studios contract players